The St. Petersburg Pier, officially known as the St. Pete Pier, is a landmark pleasure pier extending into Tampa Bay from downtown St. Petersburg, Florida, United States. Over the years several different structures have been built at the same location.  The most recent structure, the third owned by the city, was a five-story inverted pyramid-shaped building, designed by St. Petersburg architect William B. Harvard, Sr. That Inverted Pyramid Pier was closed in 2013, and the new 26-acre Pier District opened on July 6, 2020. The $92 million dollar project includes five restaurants, a playground, an environmental education center, and numerous artworks including work by Xenobia Bailey, Nathan Mabry, Nick Ervinck, and a large sculpture entitled Bending Arc by Janet Echelman. Its opening was scheduled for May 30, 2020, but was postponed due to the COVID-19 pandemic in Florida.

History
Before the construction of a centralized pier in St. Petersburg, Florida, there were several smaller piers that jutted out into the Tampa Bay from 1854 to the creation of the Railroad Pier in 1889. The first of which resulted from an expedition by Lt. C.H. Berryman replying to Florida senator David Levy Yulee to survey land for optimal partitions of railroad lines following the 1850 Florida Swamp Land Act to the region. Though due to the railroad being halted in Cedar Key, Florida the project was soon deserted, however the findings did stimulate active ideas in extending the line to the greater Tampa Bay metropolitan area due to his 1855 report.

Early constructed piers 
The first centralized pier was created in 1889 when the Orange Belt Railway, brought by Peter Demens, constructed the Railroad Pier stretching from around 2,000 to 3,000 feet into the Tampa Bay after being convinced by John C. Williams. Built on 1st Avenue South, the Railroad Pier allowed for steamboats and cargo-freight ships to enter and dock in its 12-feet-deep waters. It was deemed by Demens to be a tourist attraction, later instigating the construction of a bathing pavilion in the two years following its opening. In the same year, Henry W. Hibbs leased part of the pier to open a fishing business which quickly grew the industry of fishing in the area.

During these early years, Demens sold off the railway to Henry B. Plant, who converted the railway into the Sanford and St. Petersburg Railroad. Not wanting to lose business interest in his holdings, Plant and his associates held a monopoly on the pier going as far as to block further dredging of the channel later in 1901. As an alternative to the Railroad Pier, D.F.S. Brantley constructed the Brantley Pier in 1896 at the length of 1,500 feet in 7-foot-deep waters. The Brantley Pier also hosted a bathing pavilion, and was built farther north at 2nd Avenue North. As competition between the piers grew, it helped to facilitate William Straub of the St. Petersburg Times to successfully advocate for the waterfronts to be used for public parks in the early 20th century.

A third pier was built by Edwin H. Tomlinson in 1901 south of the Railroad Pier on 4th Avenue South which was named the Fountain of Youth Pier. The pier featured a cottage at the edge of the pier, and a well that was drilled near the entrance having water that held similar promises of the famed Fountain of Youth.

The Brantley Pier was demolished in 1904 and was soon replaced by the Electric Pier constructed by F.A. Davis in 1905. The Electric Pier had a length of 3,000 feet and was 16 feet in width. The pier was illuminated with light bulbs and featured an electric trolley that could move both passengers and cargo down the length of the pier, rivaling that of the Railroad Pier once again. In 1908, Jesse F. Conrad purchased the pier from Tomlinson and added an arch for the entrance of the pier as well as turning the well into a spa.

The city of St. Petersburg built its first pier, the Municipal Recreation Pier, ten feet north of the Electric Pier in 1913 after a $40,000 bond was authorized by voters. The Municipal Recreation Pier was an effort by the city to boost its tourism, enhance the cities parks, and was used solely for recreational activities. A year later in 1914 the Electric Pier was demolished.

In the aftermath of the 1921 Tampa Bay Hurricane, the Fountain of Youth Pier was destroyed and the spa building at its base collapsed. The rest of the piers were severely damaged as the Railroad Pier  had a water tank and Henry W. Hibbs fishing unit left standing while the Municipal Recreation Pier had only pilings remaining. Soon after the Municipal Recreation Pier was repaired, although engineers had alerted public officials that the pier would need to be replaced thereafter. As a result, Lew B. Brown, a publisher of the Evening Independent, promoted an effort to construct a new pier entitled "The Million Dollar Pier". Brown had organized the community into donating $300,000 dollars towards the pier, with the remaining funds being bonded from the city. Voters in 1925 voted to endorse a $1 million bond towards a new pier structure, and construction of the pier began the same year. In total, the pier would cost $998,729.18 (USD) dollars ($ in  dollars).

The Million Dollar Pier 
After a year of construction, the Million Dollar Pier was opened on November 25, 1926 with 10,000 individuals in attendance. The pier extended 1,452 feet into the bay with the bridge measuring 100 feet in width. At the head of the pier stood a building named the Casino, a Mediterranean Revival architecture structure. The Casino had hosted a central atrium for vehicles, an open air ballroom and theater, and an observation deck. Along its base and approach the pier also accommodated a beach, a solarium, and a streetcar line. In July 1927, the radio station WSUN began operation on the second floor of the Casino in the Shrine Club.

In 1952, the Railroad Pier was demolished ending the early era of public constructed piers.

In the mid 1960s, the pier began to become neglected sparking different groups to suggest replacements for the pier, though all were shot down by the city council. Due to considerable repairs and renovations that would be needed to upkeep the pier, the demolition of the Million Dollar Pier Casino structure started in July 1967 and was completed in the same year by the Cuyahoga Wrecking Company.

The Inverted Pyramid Pier 

After the demolition, the pier's head was converted into a park that included benches, tables, and shelters. In the ensuing years the city considered many ideas to replace the pier ranging from industrial and commercial uses. In 1969, the city council authorized a pier project slated to be completed for the 19701971 tourist season at the cost of $2 million. The project selected was the Inverted Pyramid Pier designed by William B. Harvard Sr., designed to minimize blocking the a view of Tampa Bay. The following year in 1970, the pier project was granted an additional $800,000 dollars to construct the design.

The Inverted Pyramid Pier opened on January 15, 1973 after delays and a budget of around $4 million. Upon its opening, the Marriott Corporation was given a five-year contract in managing the pier. With a tubular steel framework to create large windows for panoramic views of Tampa Bay and a larger top floor and observation deck.

On March 20, 1976, the city dedicated a laser sculpture by Rockne Krebs entitled Starboard Home on the Range, Part VI. The sculpture featured a green laser beam from the pier directed towards downtown St. Petersburg, reflecting to the pier several times with mirrors, finally reflecting out to Tampa Bay. When ongoing technical problems with cooling the laser engine caused repeated dysfunction, the laser sculpture was shut down.

In 1986, the Inverted Pyramid Pier closed for renovations, however after delays and an expanded restoration budget of $12 million the pier reopened on August 27, 1988.

In 2004, the city of St. Petersburg found that the structure of The Pier could no longer be funded as it cost too much in upkeep and a new pier would replace the current inverted pyramid pier in the coming years. In April 2005, Pinellas County created a plan to set aside $50 million for the new plans for the pier. In 2009, an official Pier Task Force was created and set an international design competition which included 29 architectural firms that submitted designs. The Inverted Pyramid Pier officially closed on May 31, 2013.

Plans for a new pier

The Lens
In a straw-poll vote (5–3) after a two-hour workshop on August 18, 2010, the St. Petersburg City Council accepted Mayor Bill Foster's recommendation to demolish the current pier. A binding vote, 7–1, was taken at an August 26 meeting. On January 20, 2012, the St. Petersburg Pier International Design Competition Jury unanimously selected Michael Maltzan Architecture's "The Lens" as the design for the new pier out of the original 29 architectural firms that submitted designs for the pier. Design proposals by the top three competitors included Bjarke Ingels Group's (BIG) "The Wave" and West 8's "The People's Pier". In September 2012, the city applied to the U.S. Army Corps of Engineers for a permit to demolish the pier. Approval would have taken 6 to 12 months.

A campaign to stop the destruction of the existing pier and prevent The Lens design from replacing it resulted in a referendum. One issue with The Lens design was its plans for a visible reef that low visibility in Tampa Bay made unrealistic. On August 27, 2013, city residents voted to cancel the contract with Michael Maltzan Architecture, ending The Lens project.

Pier Park 

After The Lens design was turned down by the citizens of St. Petersburg, mayor Rick Kriseman asked for the request for qualification for a design consultant in January 2014. Later a group was established called the Pier Working Group to incorporate elements and activities from the community in order to set the basis for the new pier.

The process of finding a new pier began with sixteen initial teams that submitted a statement of qualification on September 8, 2014 with ideas ranging from renovating to replacing the current pier. From those initial teams, eight were invited by the city of St. Petersburg to the second stage of the selection process. Designs for the new pier concept were due on December 15, 2014 by the selected eight teams. After review from the selection committee of the designs introduced by the teams, the design teams were shortlisted on January 23, 2015 to include seven of the original eight teams, dropping "The Crescent" by ahha! Design Group. Over the course of the next month from January to February, public outreach was collected based on the shortlisting and the teams presented their pier concepts to the public. A public online survey ensued from February to March, which the results from citizens of St. Petersburg favored the "Destination St. Pete Pier" by the St. Pete Design Group followed by "Pier Park" by ASD Architects, Rogers Partners Architects+Urban Designers, & Ken Smith Architect and "Blue Pier" by W Architecture and Landscape Architecture.

A meeting with the pier committee was held on March 20, 2015 to decide the top three rankings for the pier. During this meeting, the committee evaluated the designs of all seven piers viewing each pro's and con's and hearing comments from both the committee and public. In conclusion of the meeting, four of the seven teams were eliminated which excluded the "Blue Pier", "Discover Bay Life Pier", "rePier", and "Prospect Pier". The top three piers were ranked by "ALMA" first, "Destination St. Pete Pier" second, and "Pier Park" third, however the movement to rank the piers in the order given was failed during a vote between the committee. Weeks after the initial meeting, mayor Rick Kriseman commented that the residents just want to see their elected officials build a pier.

During a final hearing on April 23, 2015, the selection committee had two meetings. The first involved a questions and answers for the top three teams and the second included a hearing from the public with final consideration for the top three designs. During the second meeting, the selection committee ranked the piers by several major criteria. During the late night meeting, the committee ranked "Pier Park" as their number one pick followed by the favored "Destination St. Pete Pier" ranked second and "ALMA" by Alfonso Architects ranked third. The St. Petersburg City Council approved of the "Pier Park" plans on May 7, 2015 in a 7 to 1 vote, and approved the contract on June 9, 2015.

On July 9, 2015, the city council approved on a $5.2 million deal to demolish the current pier and to finalize the Pier Park. The demolition of the pier began on August 18, 2015. On November 17, 2015, the St. Petersburg Pier structure was fully demolished. After the demolition of the structure, the approach of the pier was next which was estimated to be fully demolished four months after starting. The entire demolition was expected to be done by February 2016, however it was completed in late 2016 on the account of safety concerns from the decay of the construction materials that were reinforced over the lifetime of the pier's approach and base structure. A redesign on the pier was presented on March 17, 2016 with mixed reactions from officials, though it was viewed positively by the city's council. Due to the redesign, budget cuts were soon imposed on the Pier's concepts.

Pier Park's groundbreaking began on June 28, 2017. On September 25, 2017, Pinellas County granted an expanded budget of $76 million towards the Pier's district. In December 2017, the pier's concrete pilings were around "three quarters of the way done" with the deck "about half done". In April 2018, three artists were announced to create public art for the pier's surrounding and immediate district, including Nick Ervinck, Nathan Mabry, and Xenobia Bailey. In August 2018, it was approved by the cities council to install a Janet Echelman sculpture in the pier's district. Vertical construction on the Pier's structure began in November 2018.

Its original opening was scheduled for May 30, 2020, but was postponed due to the COVID-19 pandemic in Florida. The pier and pier district opened on July 6. The renovated St. Pete Pier features a variety of restaurants. The new addition to the city sits on 26 acres of land.

In popular culture 
On June 17, 1922, 18-year-old Dorothy MacLatchie was killed by a "monster fish" while floating next to the Municipal Recreation Pier in St. Petersburg, Florida. While some reports indicate her death was caused by a shark, newspaper accounts indicate her death was caused by a barracuda.

A significant amount of footage was filmed in and around the Pier for the second and third season of the mid-1990s television series seaQuest DSV.

The Pier was shown prominently on the cover of local zombie anthology, Zombie St. Pete. This is a short story collection featuring fictional zombie attacks in the St. Petersburg city. The Pier also held the Zombie St. Pete book release party on February 27, 2010.

References

External links
Official website

Buildings and structures in St. Petersburg, Florida
Tourist attractions in St. Petersburg, Florida
Inverted pyramids
Cultural infrastructure completed in 1973
Modernist architecture in Florida
Piers in Florida
Pyramids in the United States
Buildings and structures demolished in 2015
1973 establishments in Florida